Uncut Gems is a 2019 American crime thriller film directed by Josh and Benny Safdie, who co-wrote the screenplay with Ronald Bronstein. It stars Adam Sandler, LaKeith Stanfield, Julia Fox, Kevin Garnett, Idina Menzel, and Eric Bogosian. The film tells the story of Howard Ratner (Sandler), a Jewish-American jeweler and gambling addict in New York City's Diamond District, who must retrieve an expensive gem he purchased in order to pay off his debts. Filming took place from September to November 2018. The original score was composed by Daniel Lopatin. 

The film premiered at the 46th Telluride Film Festival on August 30, 2019. A24 gave it a limited release in the United States on December 13, 2019, and a wide release on December 25. Uncut Gems received widespread critical acclaim, especially for Sandler's performance, which several reviewers described as the best of his career, and it was chosen by the National Board of Review as one of the top ten films of 2019.

Plot
In 2010, Ethiopian Jewish miners retrieve a rare black opal from the Welo mine in Ethiopia. In 2012, gambling addict Howard Ratner runs KMH, a jewelry store in New York City's Diamond District. Howard struggles to pay off his gambling debts, which include $100,000 he owes to Arno, his loan shark brother-in-law. His domestic life is split between his wife Dinah, who has agreed to divorce after Passover, and his girlfriend Julia, a KMH employee.

Howard's business associate Demany brings basketball star Kevin Garnett to KMH. While he is there, the opal, which Howard had smuggled in, arrives. Garnett becomes obsessed with it, insisting on holding onto it for good luck at his game that night. Howard reluctantly agrees, demanding Garnett's 2008 NBA Championship ring as collateral.

After Garnett leaves, Howard pawns the ring, placing a six-way parlay on him playing extraordinarily well in that night's game, which he does. The next day, Demany says that Garnett still has the opal, angering him. Howard is ambushed at his daughter's school play by Arno and his mafia handlers, Phil and Nico. His winning bet should have won him $600,000, but Arno placed a stop on the bet, as it was made with money Howard owed him. Phil and Nico strip Howard naked and lock him in the trunk of his car, forcing him to call Dinah for help.

Howard meets Demany at a nightclub party hosted by R&B singer the Weeknd to retrieve the opal, but learns that Garnett still has it. Howard finds Julia snorting cocaine in a bathroom with the Weeknd and, believing they were having sex, gets into a fight with him. Feeling betrayed, Howard confronts Julia and demands that she move out of his apartment.

Garnett returns the opal before an auction, offering to purchase it for $175,000, but Howard refuses, as he believes it is worth much more. Garnett demands his ring back, but Howard lies that it's at his house. After Garnett leaves in dismay, Howard berates Demany for allowing Garnett to hold onto the opal for so long. Incensed, Demany quits, trashing Howard's office. After an awkward Passover dinner, Dinah rejects Howard's plea to give their marriage another chance.

Just before the auction starts, Howard discovers the opal has in fact been appraised for significantly less than his initial estimate of $1 million. He convinces his father-in-law Gooey to bid on the gem to drive up the price, but the plan backfires when Garnett fails to top Gooey's final bid. A furious Gooey gives Howard the opal before Arno, Phil, and Nico assault him outside the auction house. He returns to KMH, bloody and in tears. Julia comforts him and they reconcile.

Howard learns Garnett still wants to buy the opal, so he pays him at KMH with cash. Although Howard could repay his debt to Arno, he asks Julia to put the cash on a three-way parlay on Garnett having a strong performance. Arno, Phil, and Nico arrive at KMH just before Garnett leaves, but before they enter Howard's office, Julia escapes. The thugs find and threaten him, while she goes by helicopter to the Mohegan Sun casino to place the bet. Arno tells Howard to call Julia and cancel it, but he refuses. Furious, the three attempt to pursue her, but Howard locks them between the store's security doors. He watches the game on television, taunting the three by pointing out their court-side mob associates while they remain trapped.

The Boston Celtics win the game, earning Howard $1.2 million. Ecstatic, he frees the three thugs, but an enraged Phil shoots Howard in the face, killing him instantly. Arno protests before attempting to escape, leading Phil to shoot him dead as well. Julia leaves the casino with Howard's winnings as Phil and Nico loot the store.

Cast

John Amos, Ca$h Out, and Trinidad James appear as themselves, with Amos appearing as Howard's neighbor and the others as acquaintances of Demany. Tilda Swinton and Natasha Lyonne have vocal cameos as the auction manager and a Celtics staff member, respectively, and Doc Rivers has a vocal cameo as himself. Pom Klementieff has a brief cameo as Lexis, a friend of Julia.

Production
Josh and Benny Safdie's Jewish upbringing was essential to their crafting of the film, and the story was heavily influenced by their father's time working in the Diamond District as a salesman. When creating the character of Howard, they said they were heavily influenced by Jewish humor and actors from the 20th century, wanting Howard to encompass Jewish stereotypes proudly and treat them as a "superpower." The Jewish concept of "learning through suffering" was important for the character of Howard throughout the film. The Safdies conceived the film in 2009, and approached Adam Sandler to star, but Sandler's manager rejected the script before Sandler got a chance to read it.

In May 2016, it was announced that the Safdies were going to direct the film from a screenplay they wrote alongside Ronald Bronstein, and that Elara Pictures and RT Features would produce, with Emma Tillinger Koskoff and Martin Scorsese serving as executive producers. Jonah Hill joined the cast in May 2017, with Scott Rudin, Eli Bush, and Sebastian Bear-McClard set to produce, and A24 distributing.

Sandler replaced Hill in April 2018. Eric Bogosian and Judd Hirsch joined the cast that August, and, the next month, Kevin Garnett, LaKeith Stanfield, and Idina Menzel joined the project, with Netflix acquiring international distribution rights. Kobe Bryant, Amar'e Stoudemire, and Joel Embiid were also considered for Garnett's role. The Safdies had originally written the part with Bryant in mind, but by the time they finished the script, Bryant was only interested in directing. Embiid was attached to the film at one point, but he could no longer take the role when production was moved to the fall, as he would be busy playing basketball, so the Safdies began to look at retired players, and settled on Garnett.

In October 2018, it was revealed that The Weeknd, Trinidad James, and Pom Klementieff had joined the cast. Klementieff's scenes, apart from a brief cameo during the film's opening credits, were cut from the final edit.

Principal photography began on September 25, 2018, in New York City, and concluded on November 15. The film was shot by Darius Khondji on 35 mm film, using long zoom lenses. The opening and closing sequences were inspired by the gemological photomicrography of Eduard Gübelin and Danny J. Sanchez.

Music

Daniel Lopatin composed the film's original score. He also recorded several songs with the Weeknd for the film, but they went unused; however, he has production credits on the Weeknd's 2020 album, After Hours. A soundtrack album of Lopatin's music for the film was released on December 13, 2019, on CD, vinyl, and digital streaming services.

Release
Uncut Gems had its world premiere at the 46th Telluride Film Festival on August 30, 2019, and it screened at the 2019 Toronto International Film Festival on September 9. It received a limited theatrical release in the United States on December 13, before its nationwide release on December 25. The film was released internationally on Netflix on January 31, 2020, and it began streaming on the service in the United States on May 25, 2020.

Reception

Box office
The first weekend of its limited release, the film made $537,242 from five theaters; its per-venue average of $107,448 was the highest ever for A24 and the second-best of any film released in 2019. It made $241,431 its second weekend in theaters.

The film made $5.9 million on the first day of its wide release (including $1.1 million from previews on Christmas Eve), which was the highest single-day gross in A24's history. It went on to make a total of $18.5 million over the five-day long holiday weekend ($9.6 million of which was during the weekend-proper), finishing sixth at the box office. In its second weekend of wide release, the film made $7.5 million, finishing eighth at the box office. By the end of its theatrical run, the film had earned $50 million, and it was A24's highest-grossing film domestically until it was surpassed by Everything Everywhere All at Once in May 2022.

Critical response

On Rotten Tomatoes, the film has an approval rating of 91% based on 348 reviews, with an average score of 8.4/10; the site's "critics consensus" reads: "Uncut Gems reaffirms the Safdies as masters of anxiety-inducing cinema—and proves Adam Sandler remains a formidable dramatic actor when given the right material." On Metacritic, the film has a weighted average score of 91 out of 100 based on reviews by 56 critics, indicating "universal acclaim". Audiences polled by CinemaScore during the film's limited release gave it an average grade of "A−" on an A+ to F scale; upon going wide, it earned a "C+" score, as well as an average score of 2 out of 5 stars on PostTrak.

After the film debuted at Telluride, Todd McCarthy of The Hollywood Reporter wrote: "Many will agree that this is Sandler's best performance, and the Safdies will finally move from the fringes of the commercial film scene to somewhere closer to the center." Eric Kohn of IndieWire gave the film a grade of "A", calling it "a riveting high-wire act, pairing cosmic visuals with the gritty energy of a dark psychological thriller and sudden bursts of frantic comedy".

Jake Cole of Slant Magazine gave the film 3.5 out of 4 stars, writing: "As in Good Time, Uncut Gems finds the Safdies working in a genre rooted in the grimy, character-oriented crime films of the '70s." Radheyan Simonpillai of Now commented that "there's so much propulsive, forward momentum even when the characters never get anywhere." In her round-up of the 2019 Toronto International Film Festival, Wendy Ide of The Guardian ranked Uncut Gems as one of the best films of the year, calling it "Audacious, thrilling and exhausting", describing Sandler's "remarkable performance" as one of the best performances of the year, and praising the cinematography.

Justin Chang of the Los Angeles Times said: "Directed with relentless tension and diamond-hard intelligence by Josh and Benny Safdie (who earlier this month won directing honors from the New York Film Critics Circle), Uncut Gems is a thriller and a character study, a tragedy and a blast." Peter Bradshaw of The Guardian called the film "a cinema of pure energy and grungy voltage, and the Safdies make it look very easy. This will be the year's most exciting film."

Kevin Garnett's performance was also praised, with Brady Langmann of Esquire calling it the year's best breakout performance, and Alan Siegel writing on The Ringer that it was "one of the best acting performances by an athlete ever."

Accolades
According to a list compiled by Metacritic, Uncut Gems was included on the fifth-most year-end "Top Ten" lists of the best films of 2019 that were published by major film critics and publications. The film was ranked by The A.V. Club as the 92nd-best film of the 2010s.

Reaction to award nominations
Critics and commentators considered Sandler to be a viable contender to be nominated for the Academy Award for Best Actor for his performance in Uncut Gems. During a December 2019 interview with Howard Stern, Sandler jokingly promised to make the "worst movie ever" if he did not win an Oscar for Uncut Gems, saying: "If I don't get it, I'm going to... come back and do one again that is so bad on purpose just to make you all pay. That's how I get them."

When nominees for the 92nd Academy Awards were announced in January 2020, Sandler did not receive a nomination. Reacting to the announcement, he congratulated Kathy Bates—his former co-star in The Waterboy(1998)—on her Best Supporting Actress nomination, and wrote: "Bad news: Sandman gets no love from the Academy. Good news: Sandman can stop wearing suits."

References

External links
 

2019 films
2019 crime drama films
2019 crime thriller films
2019 thriller drama films
2010s gang films
A24 (company) films
Adultery in films
American basketball films
American crime drama films
American crime thriller films
American gangster films
American thriller drama films
Boston Celtics
English-language Netflix original films
Films about Jews and Judaism
Films directed by the Safdie brothers
Films produced by Scott Rudin
Films scored by Daniel Lopatin
Films set in the 2010s
Films set in 2010
Films set in 2012
Films set in Connecticut
Films set in Ethiopia
Films set in Manhattan
Films set in Philadelphia
Films shot in Connecticut
Films shot in New York City
Films about gambling
Hood films
American independent films
2019 independent films
2010s English-language films
2010s American films